Gilbert L. "Whip" Wilson (born March 17, 1947) is an American Democratic Party politician who has been the sheriff of Camden County, New Jersey since December 2015. He served in the New Jersey General Assembly from 2010. when he was selected by party leaders to fill the vacant seat of Donald Norcross who had moved up to the New Jersey Senate, until December 2015 when he resigned in order to take office as sheriff . While in the Assembly, he represented the 5th Legislative District. Wilson was a councilman at-large in the City of Camden from 1997 to 2000 and again from 2005 to 2010.

Biography
Wilson was born and raised in Camden, graduating from Camden High School in 1965. He served in the United States Air Force from 1965 to 1969, in a tour of duty including San Antonio, Texas, Little Rock, Arkansas, Thailand and Vietnam. He received the Air Force Commendation Medal, the Air Force Good Conduct Medal, the National Defense Service Medal, and the Vietnam Service Medal.

Wilson joined the Camden Police Department after his discharge from the Air Force. While a police officer, he attended Camden County College and Glassboro State College (now Rowan University), graduating with a bachelor's degree in law and criminal justice. He served in the Police Department for more than 26 years, retiring as a lieutenant. He was the Commander of the Vice Unit and Supervisor of the First Community Policing Unit.

Wilson was elected Councilman-at-Large of the Camden City Council in May 1997, serving until July 2001. He returned to the City Council in July 2005. On January 17, 2010, when Assemblyman Donald Norcross was selected by Camden County and Gloucester County Democrats to replace Dana Redd in the New Jersey Senate, Wilson was selected to fill the vacancy left by Norcross. He was sworn into office on January 25, 2010.

While serving in the Assembly, his 5th District running mates included Senators Norcross until November 4, 2014, and Nilsa Cruz-Perez since December 15, 2014 and Assemblymembers Angel Fuentes from Wilson's entrance until Fuentes' resignation in June 2015 and Patricia Egan Jones for the last month of Wilson's Assembly term. In the 2014–2015 Assembly session, he was the vice-chair of the Agriculture and Natural Resources Committee and the Law and Public Safety Committee in addition to serving on the Military and Veterans' Affairs Committee.

After being elected to complete the unexpired term in a 2010 special election and two successful subsequent re-election bids for full terms, Wilson announced his intention to seek the office of Camden County Sheriff in 2015 and retire from the Assembly. After he won the November general election for sheriff, Wilson resigned his Assembly seat on December 2, 2015, due to a 1971 law that requires the sheriff-elect to be sworn in within 30 days of the election and a law that bans dual officeholding in New Jersey.

References

External links

Official County biography
New Jersey Legislature financial disclosure forms - 2012 2011 2010 2009

1947 births
Living people
African-American police officers
African-American sheriffs
African-American state legislators in New Jersey
American municipal police officers
Camden County College alumni
Democratic Party members of the New Jersey General Assembly
New Jersey city council members
New Jersey sheriffs
Politicians from Camden, New Jersey
Rowan University alumni
United States Air Force airmen
United States Air Force personnel of the Vietnam War
21st-century American politicians
20th-century African-American people
21st-century African-American politicians